A. J. Cole III (born November 27, 1995) is an American football punter  for the Las Vegas Raiders of the National Football League (NFL). He played college football at N.C. State.

Early life and high school
Cole grew up in College Park, Georgia and attended Woodward Academy, where he played football, basketball, and soccer. As a senior, Cole was named All-Metro Area by The Atlanta Journal-Constitution.

College career
Cole was a four year starter at punter for the NC State Wolfpack. He finished his collegiate career with 9,288 punting yards (third-highest in school history) and averaged 42.2 yards per punt. He was a finalist for the Wuerffel Trophy as a junior and a semifinalist for the award as a senior. In 2017 Cole was awarded Honorable Mention All-American honors by GPR Analytics.

Professional career

Cole was signed as an undrafted free agent by the Oakland Raiders on May 6, 2019, after participating in a rookie mini camp with the team. He beat out incumbent punter Johnny Townsend during training camp to make the Raiders 53 man roster.

Cole made his NFL debut on September 9, 2019, against the Denver Broncos, punting three times for 134 yards (44.7 average). Cole finished his rookie season with 67 punts for 3,081 yards (46.0 yards per punt). In the 2020 season, Cole punted 44 times for an average of 44.1 yards.

2021 season
On December 9, 2021, Cole signed a four-year, $12.4 million contract extension with the Raiders. On December 20, 2021, Cole was named to the 2022 NFL Pro Bowl. Cole led the league among qualified punters in yards per punt in 2021, averaging 50.03 yards per punt. Cole received first-team All-Pro distinction in 2021.

2022 season
At the start of the season Cole was named, for the first time in his career, one of the team captains. On the 2022 season, Cole had 59 punts for 2,884 net yards for a 48.88 average. On January 30, 2023, Cole was named to his second Pro Bowl, replacing Tommy Townsend.

References

External links
NC State Wolfpack bio
Las Vegas Raiders bio

1995 births
Living people
American football punters
NC State Wolfpack football players
Las Vegas Raiders players
Oakland Raiders players
Players of American football from Georgia (U.S. state)
Sportspeople from College Park, Georgia
Woodward Academy alumni
American Conference Pro Bowl players